Just Outside the Door is a 1921 American silent drama film directed by George Irving and starring Edith Hallor, Betty Blythe and J. Barney Sherry.

Cast
 Edith Hallor as Madge Pickton
 Betty Blythe as Floria Wheaton
 J. Barney Sherry as Edward Burleigh 
 A. Edward Sutherland as Ned Pickton 
 Arnold Gray as Dick Wheaton

References

Bibliography
 Munden, Kenneth White. The American Film Institute Catalog of Motion Pictures Produced in the United States, Part 1. University of California Press, 1997.

External links
 

1921 films
1921 drama films
1920s English-language films
American silent feature films
Silent American drama films
Films directed by George Irving
Selznick Pictures films
1920s American films